The Commission on Filipinos Overseas (CFO) is an agency of the government of the Philippines under the Office of the President of the Philippines. CFO was established on June 16, 1980, through the enactment of Batas Pambansa Blg. 79. 

The agency is responsible for promoting and upholding the interest of Filipino emigrants and Filipino permanent residents in other countries. It is also responsible for preserving and strengthening ties with Filipino communities outside the Philippines. It is headed by a Chairperson who is bestowed with a Cabinet rank of Secretary.

History

The evolution of the Commission on Filipinos Overseas can be traced with the passage of Presidential Decree No. 442 (Labor Code of the Philippines), which was enacted in 1974, creating the Office of Emigrant Affairs, along with the Overseas Employment Development Board (now POEA) among other offices created.

The following years were characterized by a steady increase in migration, thus making it necessary to establish an independent unit which would constitute a local support network solely for Filipino emigrants.

In June 1980, Batas Pambansa Blg. 79 was enacted to strengthen the government’s policy on the promotion of migrant welfare and interest. It created the Commission on Filipinos Overseas which replaced OEA but retained and further expanded its mandate. The decree specifically identified Filipino emigrants as the recipients of its services.

Functions
The main task of the Commission on Filipinos Overseas is to register and provide pre-departure orientation seminars to Filipino emigrants; to promote the transfer of technology, material contributions, and financial contributions of Filipino emigrants from abroad to underserved communities in the Philippines; to provide the younger generation of Filipinos overseas with opportunities to learn the history of the Philippines, Filipino culture, Philippine institutions, and the Philippine languages.
In accordance with Batas Pambansa Blg. 79, the Commission on Filipinos Overseas is mandated to perform the following duties:
To assist the President of the Philippines and the Congress of the Philippines in formulating policies and measures concerning or affecting Filipinos abroad;
To develop and implement programs that will promote the interest and well-being of Filipinos abroad;
To serve as a forum for preserving and enhancing the social, economic, and cultural ties of Filipinos abroad with the Philippines;
To provide liaison services to Filipinos residing outside the Philippines with appropriate government and private agencies in the transaction of business and similar projects in the Philippines.

Clientele
The primary clientele of the Commission on Filipinos Overseas are:
 Filipino permanent migrants or permanent residents abroad;
 Filipinos overseas who have become naturalized citizens of other countries or dual citizens;
 Filipino spouses and other partners of foreign nationals leaving the country;
 Descendants of Filipinos overseas, as defined in Batas Pambansa Blg. 79;
 Filipino youth overseas;
 Exchange Visitor Program participants; and
 Filipino Au Pair participants.

CFO Offices 
CFO's principal office is located in Paco, Manila.  It has extension offices in Cebu and Davao and maintains an assistance desk in NAIA Terminal 1 (departure area).  The CFO may be reached thru the following contact information:

 CFO Manila -  Citigold Center, 1345 Quirino Highway corner South Superhighway, Paco, Manila.   Tel. No. (trunkline): (02) 8552-4700.  
 CFO Cebu - Ground floor, K&J Building,  #4 Don Julio Llorente St., Capitol Site, Cebu City 6000.  Tel. Nos. (32) 255-5253 and (0917) 308-1378. 
 CFO Davao - Virtual (online services only) We will have a new location in Davao City.  Watch out for our further announcements.  Tel. Nos. (82) 228-3033 and (0945) 814-4333.  
 CFO NAIA Terminal 1 - Located at departure area.  Only caters to exempted clients such as senior citizens and those who have been living abroad with PR cards.  Tel. No. (02) 8879-5685

Programs and Services 
 Pre-Departure Orientation Seminars (PDOS) for Emigrants: The CFO conducts Pre-Departure Orientation Seminars (PDOS) for 20 to 59-year-old Filipino emigrants with the core objective of providing them the relevant information needed to address concerns about permanently residing overseas.
 Peer Counseling
 Guidance and Counseling Program (GCP): During the one-on-one, counselors can address counselees’ questions on a more personal level, hopefully leading them towards empowerment, in dealing with the realities of intermarriage.
 Au Pairs Country Familiarization Seminar
 Exchange Visitor Program (EVP)
 PESO Sense: The Philippine Financial Freedom Campaign: In line with the national development goal of financial inclusion, CFO has specifically put a focus on the financial literacy of overseas Filipinos and their families. IThe program was launched to develop or enhance personal strategies, skills and knowledge in attaining financial freedom. This nationwide Financial Literacy Campaign seeks to achieve its main objective of improving financial literacy by promoting productive expenditures, greater savings and entrepreneurship among overseas Filipinos and the beneficiaries of their remittances.
 BaLinkBayan program
 Philippine Schools Overseas (PSO)
 Community Education Program (CEP)
 Lingkod sa Kapwa Pilipino (LINKAPIL) or Link for Philippine Development program. Overseas Filipinos can channel their assistance to support projects in livelihood/micro-enterprise development, education, health and welfare, small-scale infrastructure, and technology and skills transfer. CFO also maintains active linkages with Filipino associations and other possible donors overseas, as well as local partners in the Philippines, to encourage investments and partnerships for development.The LINKAPIL was established by the Commission on Filipinos Overseas in 1989 to seek a broader and deeper partnership between overseas Filipinos and Filipinos in the home country based on a common desire to advance the collective good of the Filipino people and to contribute to the realization of national development. It means “service to fellow Filipinos.” The LINKAPIL program facilitates the transfer of assistance from Filipinos and other donors overseas to support projects in livelihood development, education, health and welfare, small-scale infrastructure, and technology and skills transfer
Youth Leaders in the Diaspora  (YouLeaD) is a Philippine cultural immersion program in the Philippines intended for Filipino youth who were born abroad or migrated at an early age, such that they are not very familiar with Philippine culture. The program seeks to help participants answer long-standing questions about themselves and their identities as half- or part-Filipinos that they may have had growing 11 up. Joining the program would aid them in the journey of understanding a significant part of their identities, which would hopefully move them toward a more meaningful relationship with their Filipino families and the nation itself.
Virtual Sentro Rizal
 Ugnayan: Through the Ugnayan Series, CFO engaged with several Filipino community organizations and leaders in countries with large concentrations of overseas Filipinos particularly the United States. It was an opportunity for the CFO to reach out to overseas Filipinos (organizations, media, civil society, etc.) to discuss various ways of diaspora engagement for the home country’s development. 
 Presidential Awards for Filipino Individuals and Organizations Overseas (biennial awards)'''
 Overseas Filipino Centenarians:cAs one of the implementing agencies of the Centenarian Act of 2016, which aims to pay tribute to all Filipinos reaching 100 years old whether living in the Philippines or abroad, the CFO also serves as the secretariat for applications overseas by reviewing endorsements from the Department of Foreign Affairs and the Philippine Veterans Affairs Office, and by preparing a complete folio of all qualified applicants for endorsement to and evaluation and approval of the Department of Social Welfare and Development.
 Celebration of the Month of Overseas Filipinos: In June 1988, then President Corazon C. Aquino signed Proclamation No. 276 declaring December 1988 and the same month of every year as the “Month of Overseas Filipinos”. It gave recognition to overseas Filipinos who contributed to the restoration of Philippine democracy and Philippine development through their taxes and remittances.In 2007, then-President Gloria Macapagal – Arroyo signed Administrative Order No. 202 creating the Inter-Agency Committee for the Celebration of the Month Overseas Filipinos with the Philippine Migrants Rights Watch (PMRW, an umbrella organization of migrant civil society organizations) as Chair and the CFO as Co-Chair.

References

External links

https://www.facebook.com/CFOGovPH/
BalinkBayan
https://cfo-linkapil.org.ph/
https://www.evpcommittee.ph/
https://www.1343actionline.ph/
https://pesosense.com/
https://presidentialawards.cfo.gov.ph/

Overseas Filipino organizations
Government agencies under the Office of the President of the Philippines
Government agencies established in 1980
1980 establishments in the Philippines